Firozabad Mayoral Constituency is one of the 16 mayoral constituencies of Uttar Pradesh.

Total number of voters

List of Mayors

Election results

References

Firozabad
Firozabad
People from Firozabad